The William R. Bennett Bridge is a pontoon bridge in the Okanagan Valley of British Columbia, Canada. Completed on May 25, 2008, the bridge replaced the older Okanagan Lake Bridge built in 1958 to link Downtown Kelowna to West Kelowna across Okanagan Lake as part of Highway 97.

On April 21, 2005, Premier Gordon Campbell officially renamed the bridge from the Okanagan Lake Bridge to William R. Bennett Bridge in honour of former Premier William Richards Bennett, a native of Kelowna.

Construction budget
The first press release from the BC Ministry of Transportation to include budget information was in 2003. At that time, the project was estimated to cost $100 million CAD for the bridge and another $20 million CAD for the two interchange upgrades on the west side of the lake.

By June 29, 2005, the cost of the bridge was increased from the previous estimate of $100 million CAD to $144 million CAD "due to dramatic increases in the cost of construction materials and labour", which includes significant increases in the cost of concrete, steel, and fuel.  Over the next 30 years, the province of British Columbia expects to pay SNC-Lavalin a total of $179 million CAD "to design, build, finance, operate, maintain and rehabilitate the bridge".

Construction schedule
April 2005: Arthon Construction Ltd. begins bridge end preloads from rock on Westside Road
May 2005:  Arthon completes east side preload
June 2005: SNC-Lavalin Inc. is chosen to design, build, finance and operate the new bridge
July 2005: Construction begins on a dry dock near Bear Creek Provincial Park, where the bridge pontoons will be built
Q3 2005: Arthon completes preloads on west side of Lake Okanagan
Q3 2005: Graving dock ready
Q3 2006: Roadwork on both approaches begins
Q4 2006: First four pontoons in place
Q1 2007: Bridge deck construction begins
Q4 2007: All pontoons in place
Q4 2007: Roadwork on both approaches is completed
Q1 2008: Bridge deck construction is completed
Q2 2008: Test and commission
Q2 2008: Bridge officially opens
Official opening scheduled for May 25, 2008
Q2 2009: Decommission of the old bridge
Q2 2009: Shoreline restoration

Bridge facts
There are a total of 9 concrete pontoons
Three lanes are for westbound traffic
Two lanes are for eastbound traffic
The west side of the bridge has a pedestrian/cyclist and vehicle underpass at Campbell Road and another interchange at Westside Road
The Kelowna side of the bridge retains the existing pedestrian/cyclist underpass between City Park and Lake Avenue
The new bridge is designed to handle up to 80,000 vehicles daily; the old Okanagan Lake Bridge was designed to handle 38,000 vehicles daily but in 2005 handled approximately 50,000 vehicles daily
The bridge is maintained by Protrans WRB Bridge, which is a subsidiary of SNC-Lavalin.

Gallery

See also 
 List of bridges in Canada

References

External links

Ministry of Transportation: William R. Bennett Bridge
Partnerships BC project page for William R. Bennett Bridge
SNC-Lavalin Inc.
Westmar Consultants Inc. (created the initial base design for the bridge)

Bridges completed in 2008
Buildings and structures in Kelowna
Pontoon bridges
Road bridges in British Columbia
Transport in Kelowna